The agogwe is a purported small human-like biped reported in East Africa.

Sightings

William Hichens 

The first recorded sighting was by Captain William Hichens, reported in the December 1937 edition of the journal Discovery:

Cuthbert Burgoyne 

The next year, vintner Cuthbert Burgoyne wrote a letter to the journal describing a sighting of something similar in 1927:

Modern perspective 
There is no physical evidence for the Agogwe. There also haven't been any further sightings since 1927. Both men believed that what they saw could've been a monkey

References

Hominid cryptids
East African legendary creatures